Return of the Sorceress is a fantasy novel by Tim Waggoner published in November 2004, and set in the world of Dragonlance, and based on the Dungeons & Dragons role-playing game.  It is the fourth novel set in the "New Adventures" series.

Premise
Nearra and her friends plan to confront the wizard Maddoc.

Reception

References

2004 novels
Dragonlance novels